Sports in San Diego include one men's major professional sports team, several teams from other highest-level professional leagues, minor league teams, semi-pro and club teams, and college athletics. The most popular team in San Diego is the San Diego Padres of Major League Baseball (MLB). Also popular locally are the college teams of the San Diego State Aztecs, which play in NCAA Division I (FBS).

The city is also home to the National Women's Soccer League (NWSL)'s San Diego Wave FC, the National Lacrosse League (NLL)'s San Diego Seals, Major League Rugby (MLR)'s San Diego Legion, the Major Arena Soccer League (MASL)'s San Diego Sockers, the Indoor Football League (IFL)'s San Diego Strike Force, and World TeamTennis (WTT)'s San Diego Aviators, all teams in highest-level professional leagues.

San Diego is the largest American city not to have won a Super Bowl of the National Football League (NFL), World Series of Major League Baseball (MLB), NBA Finals of the National Basketball Association (NBA), or Stanley Cup of the National Hockey League (NHL). Currently, there is no NFL, NBA, or NHL team in the metropolitan San Diego area. The city does have one major league title to its name: the 1963 American Football League (AFL) Championship won by the former San Diego Chargers, when the AFL was an independent entity prior to the AFL–NFL merger in 1970. Due to its lackluster record on winning professional championships, and in some cases, retaining professional teams, some San Diego sports fans believe there is a curse on professional sports in the city. San Diego teams at the top professional levels of "non-major" sports have conversely seen much more success. San Diego teams have claimed titles at the highest level in sports such as indoor soccer, tennis, sailing, and Australian football. The San Diego Sockers, for example, have won 16 titles at the highest level of indoor soccer.

Professional teams
Of the four major professional sports leagues in the United States (the NFL, the NBA, MLB, and the NHL) San Diego has one professional team, the San Diego Padres of MLB. The city hosted the NFL's San Diego Chargers from 1961 to 2017, but the team moved to Los Angeles and is now the Los Angeles Chargers. Although the city does not have a major professional team in American football, it does have a team at the highest level of indoor football with the San Diego Strike Force of the Indoor Football League (IFL). The city also previously hosted three professional basketball teams (all between 1967 and 1984), although all were limited to short stints of existence due to arena complications and other issues: the NBA's San Diego Rockets from 1967 to 1971 (now the Houston Rockets) and San Diego Clippers from 1978 to 1984 (now the Los Angeles Clippers), and the now-defunct American Basketball Association (ABA)'s San Diego Conquistadors/Sails from 1972 to 1975. The region has never had an NHL franchise, but has hosted multiple minor league teams, including the current American Hockey League (AHL) franchise, the San Diego Gulls. In addition, San Diego has never hosted a Major League Soccer (MLS) team, but is home to the second division USL Championship (USLC)'s San Diego Loyal SC and the third division National Independent Soccer Association (NISA)'s Albion San Diego, as well as Major Arena Soccer League (MASL)'s San Diego Sockers, who represent San Diego at the top professional level of indoor soccer. The San Diego Wave FC, representing the city at the highest level of women's professional soccer in the National Women's Soccer League (NWSL), began play in 2022.

Highest-level professional teams 
The following teams compete at their sport's highest level of domestic competition

Bold indicates major professional league team

Italic indicates semi-pro or professional-level club team (highest competitive level leagues of sports with no fully-professional domestic competition)

Minor league professional teams 
The following teams compete below their sport's highest level of domestic competition

Semi-pro and amateur club teams

College athletics 
The San Diego State Aztecs (MW), the San Diego Toreros (WCC), and the UC San Diego Tritons (BWC) are NCAA Division I teams. The Cal State San Marcos Cougars (CCAA) and Point Loma Sea Lions (PacWest) are members of NCAA Division II, while the San Diego Christian Hawks (GSAC) and Saint Katherine Firebirds (CalPac) are members of the NAIA.

Teams sponsored by sport

NCAA Division I

NCAA Division II

NAIA

Events

Annual events 

The annual Farmers Insurance Open golf tournament (originally the San Diego Open and later the Buick Invitational) of the PGA Tour occurs annually at San Diego's municipally-owned Torrey Pines Golf Course, where it has taken place since 1968. The tournament was founded in 1952 and was played at a variety of venues in the San Diego area in its early years, beginning with San Diego Country Club in Chula Vista for its first two years. The tournament was also played in Rancho Santa Fe and El Cajon, as well as locally in Mission Valley and Rancho Bernardo during these years. This course was also the site of the 2008 U.S. Open Golf Championship.The Holiday Bowl has been an annual college football bowl game locally since its founding in 1978. The game was played at San Diego Stadium from its implementation until the stadium's closure in 2020. The game is now played at Petco Park. In the past, San Diego has also played host to the Harbor Bowl from 1947 to 1949 at Balboa Stadium, and the Poinsettia Bowl from 2005 to 2016 at San Diego Stadium. The original Poinsettia Bowl was played from 1952 to 1955 at Balboa Stadium between military services teams, not colleges and universities.

There have been two international track and field competitions at the Olympic Training Center in Chula Vista called the Thorpe Cup, which is an annual decathlon and heptathlon meeting between the United States and Germany.

There are several road races including the Rock 'n' Roll Marathon in June, the America's Finest City Half Marathon in August, the La Jolla Half Marathon in April, and several triathlons.

The San Diego Crew Classic, held in Mission Bay every spring, features 100 or more college and amateur crews.

The amateur beach sport Over-the-line was invented in San Diego, and the annual world Over-the-line championships are held at Mission Bay every year.

San Diego is also host to the Bayfair Cup, a hydroplane boat race in the H1 Unlimited season. The race is typically held during the Bayfair Festival on Mission Bay in San Diego.

Historic events 

 1968 NASL Final 1968 first leg
 1971 NBA All-Star Game (21st) 
 1973 Muhammad Ali vs. Ken Norton first match
 1975 NCAA Division I men's basketball tournament Final Four
 1978 MLB All-Star Game (49th)
 1982 Soccer Bowl '82
 1984 
 Summer Olympics - Equestrian events
 NLCS games 3, 4 & 5
 World Series (81st) games 1 & 2
 1988 
 Super Bowl XXII
 America's Cup (27th)
 1992
 America's Cup (28th)
 MLB All-Star Game (63rd)
 1995
 America's Cup (29th)
1997
 Summer X Games III
 1998 
 Super Bowl XXXII
 Summer X Games IV
 NLCS games 3, 4 & 5
 World Series (94th) games 3 & 4
 1999 MLS All-Star Game
 2002 NCAA Division I women's volleyball tournament
 2003 Super Bowl XXXVII
 2006 World Baseball Classic (inaugural) championship
 2008 U.S. Open (108th)
 2009 World Baseball Classic (2nd) second round
 2016 MLB All-Star Game (87th)
 2017 
 World Baseball Classic (4th) second round
 Tournament of Nations
 2020 
 USA Cross Country Championships (130th)
 ALDS & ALCS of 2020 MLB playoffs (neutral site games, no fans due to COVID-19 pandemic)
 2021 
 U.S. Open (121st)
 X Games Southern California 2021
 San Diego Open (ATP Tour)
 2022 
 USA Cross Country Championships (131st)
 NLCS games 1 & 2

Anticipated event 

 2023 World Lacrosse Championship

Venues
San Diego has several sports venues. Petco Park is home to the San Diego Padres of Major League Baseball. Snapdragon Stadium, which opened shortly before the 2022 college football season, is home to the NCAA Division I San Diego State Aztecs, San Diego Wave FC of the National Women's Soccer League, and (from 2023) the San Diego Legion of Major League Rugby, as well as local high school football championships and the Holiday Bowl, which currently features teams from the Pac-12 and Big Ten. Pechanga Arena is home to the San Diego Gulls of the American Hockey League, the San Diego Seals of the National Lacrosse League, San Diego Strike Force of the Indoor Football League and the San Diego Sockers of the Major Arena Soccer League.

From 1967 until 2017, the National Football League's San Diego Chargers played at San Diego Stadium (known at various times as Jack Murphy Stadium, Qualcomm Stadium, and SDCCU Stadium), which also housed the Aztecs, as well as local high school football championships. International soccer games and Supercross events also took place at Qualcomm where Major League Baseball was also once played. Three NFL Super Bowl championships were held there. From along with the Holiday Bowl. from 2005 through 2016, the stadium hosted a second bowl game, the Poinsettia Bowl, but the organizer of both bowl games scrapped that game after its 2016 edition. The stadium was demolished in 2021.

Balboa Stadium was the city's first stadium, constructed in 1914, where the San Diego Chargers once played. Currently soccer, football, and track and field are played in Balboa Stadium.

Sports

Baseball
The San Diego Padres of Major League Baseball (MLB) play at Petco Park, the team's home since it opened in 2004 in Downtown San Diego's East Village. Prior to the opening of Petco Park in 2004, the Padres played their home games at San Diego Stadium (also known as Jack Murphy Stadium and Qualcomm Stadium) in Mission Valley.

The Padres joined MLB in 1969 as an expansion team. The team originated as a Minor League Baseball (MiLB) team in the Pacific Coast League (PCL), where they played from 1936 through 1968 before joining Major League Baseball. As a PCL team, the Padres were based at Lane Field (now the site of the InterContinental Hotel San Diego) in Downtown's Columbia neighborhood from 1936 through 1957, and Westgate Park in Mission Valley (now the site of Fashion Valley Mall) from 1958 through 1967. Their final season as a minor league team, 1968, was also their first at San Diego Stadium.

San Diego has hosted the MLB All-Star Game three times: 1978 and 1992 at San Diego Stadium, and 2016 at Petco Park. The 2016 edition was the final All-Star game to determine home field advantage in the World Series.

Petco Park has additionally hosted the World Baseball Classic three times: 2006, the inaugural tournament (for which San Diego hosted the championship), 2009, and 2017.

Additionally popular are the local college baseball teams, particularly NCAA Division I's San Diego State Aztecs, San Diego Toreros, and UC San Diego Tritons. The Aztecs, Toreros, and Tritons each play home games at their own on-campus venues, Tony Gwynn Stadium, Fowler Park, and Triton Ballpark, respectively.

MLB All-Star Games

Football
The most popular American football team in San Diego currently is the San Diego State Aztecs football team of NCAA Division I FBS. The Aztecs moved into their new Snapdragon Stadium upon its completion in August 2022. The San Diego Toreros football team of NCAA Division I FCS also garners a local following. The Toreros are based at their on-campus stadium, Torero Stadium.

San Diego is also home to the San Diego Strike Force of the Indoor Football League (IFL), the highest level of professional Indoor American football. The Strike Force began play in 2019.

The city does not currently host a National Football League (NFL) team, though it previously hosted the San Diego Chargers, who were based in San Diego from 1961 through the 2016 season. The Chargers began play in 1960 as a charter member of the American Football League (AFL), and spent its first season in Los Angeles where it struggled to garner a following before moving to San Diego in 1961. The Chargers joined the NFL as result of the AFL–NFL merger in 1970, and played their home games initially at Balboa Stadium, then at San Diego Stadium from 1967 until relocating to Los Angeles in 2017. The team moved to Los Angeles following a request by owner Dean Spanos to relocate the team to SoFi Stadium, a new stadium constructed by Los Angeles Rams owner Stan Kroenke, where the Chargers would be a tenant and share the new stadium with the Rams. They are now known as the Los Angeles Chargers. The Chargers' relocation left San Diego without a professional football team for the first time since 1961.

San Diego hosted the Super Bowl three times at San Diego Stadium during the Chargers' tenure in the city.

On May 29, 2018, the Alliance of American Football (AAF) announced they would start a franchise in San Diego, the San Diego Fleet. The team played their home games at SDCCU Stadium, while San Diego native and former St. Louis Rams head coach Mike Martz was the head coach. The league suspended operations before it could complete its inaugural season.

Super Bowls (NFL)

Basketball
The most popular basketball team in San Diego currently is the San Diego State Aztecs of NCAA Division I, who play at their on-campus Viejas Arena. The San Diego Toreros and UC San Diego Tritons, also of NCAA Division I, likewise call the city home. The Toreros and Tritons teams play home games at their own on-campus arenas, the Jenny Craig Pavilion and RIMAC Arena, respectively.

San Diego has no current professional basketball representation, but the city has a significant history hosting professional basketball, nearly all encompassed within an 18-year period from 1967 to 1984.

The San Diego Rockets, a National Basketball Association (NBA) expansion team, played from 1967 to 1971. The franchise was founded and owned by local sports booster Robert Breitbard, who also founded and owned the original San Diego Gulls hockey franchise of the Western Hockey League and developed the San Diego Sports Arena (initially known as the San Diego International Sports Center), where the Rockets played. In 1971, the Rockets were sold and relocated to Houston after Breitbard encountered financial distress due to tax-assessment issues surrounding the sports arena, which ultimately prevented sale of the team to another local owner. The tax issues also led to Breitbard relinquishing control of the arena to Canadian millionaire Peter Graham, whose alleged mismanagement of the arena hampered future sports tenants. The franchise is now known as the Houston Rockets.

The 1971 NBA All-Star Game was held at the San Diego Sports Arena, hosted by the Rockets just months prior to the team's sale and relocation.

During the 1971–72 NBA season, San Diego was the part-time home of the Golden State Warriors for six home games (one each month of the season). The Warriors notably changed their name from "San Francisco" to "Golden State" prior to the season as the team was searching for a new home arena and looked to make a play for the San Diego market (as well as Oakland) following the departure of the Rockets to Houston. The team ultimately stayed in the San Francisco Bay Area, settling full time in Oakland at Oakland Arena the following season.

From 1972 to 1975, San Diego was home to the San Diego Conquistadors of the American Basketball Association (ABA), the league's first (and ultimately only) expansion team. Known as the Conquistadors ( "The Q's") for its first three seasons, the team name was changed to the San Diego Sails following a change in ownership for the 1975–76 season. The franchise was folded 11 games into that season after ownership learned that the team was to be shut out of the upcoming ABA–NBA merger, reportedly at the insistence of then-Los Angeles Lakers owner Jack Kent Cooke. Cooke was upset that the San Diego franchise had signed former Lakers star Wilt Chamberlain away from his franchise two years prior (Lakers ownership successfully sued Chamberlain over the contract, ultimately preventing Chamberlain from playing with the Conquistadors, relegating him to coaching duties) and also expressed unwillingness of allowing another team in Southern California. The Conquistadors/Sails played at Peterson Gymnasium for the 1972–73 season and Golden Hall for the 1973–74 season before ownership was permitted to base the team at the San Diego Sports Arena, where it played the remainder of its games.

Professional basketball returned from 1978 to 1984, in the form of the NBA's San Diego Clippers, the relocated successor to the Buffalo Braves franchise. The team was based at the San Diego Sports Arena. In 1981, the Clippers were bought by Los Angeles-area real estate developer Donald Sterling. Sterling attempted to move the team the following year in 1982 to his home of Los Angeles, but his request was denied by the NBA, which investigated Sterling's alleged widespread mismanagement of the franchise the same year. The investigation report recommended the termination of Sterling's ownership of the Clippers on the basis that he had failed to pay creditors and players on time. Days before a scheduled vote to terminate his ownership, he announced he would sell the team, prompting the league to cancel the scheduled vote. Sterling ultimately remained owner, satisfying league officials by instead relinquishing operational duties of the franchise. In 1984, Sterling again applied to relocate the team to Los Angeles, and despite again being denied permission to do so from the NBA, moved the team to Los Angeles Memorial Sports Arena. Lawsuits followed, but Sterling ultimately prevailed and was able to keep the team in Los Angeles, also in part due to his close personal friendship with then-Lakers owner Jerry Buss, who welcomed sharing the Los Angeles market with Sterling's franchise. The franchise is now known as the Los Angeles Clippers. San Diego has not hosted major professional basketball since.

NBA All-Star Game

Ice hockey
Though San Diego has never hosted a National Hockey League (NHL) team, the city is represented by the San Diego Gulls of the American Hockey League, the highest level of minor league ice hockey. The current version of the Gulls, which began play in 2015 after relocating from Norfolk, Virginia, plays at Pechanga Arena and following a long lineage of professional ice hockey teams which have used the San Diego Gulls name. The original San Diego Gulls, which played from 1966 until 1974, were the first tenants at the San Diego Sports Arena.

San Diego has a long history of minor league ice hockey teams, beginning with the San Diego Skyhawks that played in the Pacific Coast Hockey League from 1948 to 1950. Hockey returned in 1966 with the original San Diego Gulls of the Western Hockey League, which were created by Robert Breitbard to have a tenant for his upcoming arena, the San Diego Sports Arena. The Gulls soon grew a fanbase in San Diego, with averages of over 9,000 spectators. By 1971, the year Breitbard's National Basketball Association franchise relocated to Texas to become the Houston Rockets, the Gulls had attendances larger than both the Rockets and the Californian National Hockey League (NHL) teams, the Los Angeles Kings and Oakland Seals.

The Gulls ceased operations in 1974 to give way for the relocated San Diego Mariners of the upstart World Hockey Association (WHA), which at the time was the NHL's rival league. The WHA's financial instability caused the Mariners to fold in 1977, shortly before the NHL-WHA merger of 1979 ended the league.

Another Mariners team was one of the charter teams of the short-lived Pacific Hockey League that began play the same year the previous Mariners team folded, being renamed Hawks in the following and last PHL season. The arena remained without hockey until 1990, when another San Diego Gulls team was founded in the International Hockey League (1990–95). After the IHL team moved to Los Angeles, another Gulls team played for over a decade in both the West Coast Hockey League (1995–03) and ECHL (2003–06). The current San Diego Gulls, of the American Hockey League, started playing in 2015, and are the top minor league affiliate of the NHL's Anaheim Ducks.

San Diego was involved when the NHL expanded in the early 1990s from 22 teams to 26. Following the December 1989 announcement by the NHL of its intent to expand the league, 11 bids from 10 cities (two from San Diego) were submitted for an NHL expansion franchise. The two separate bids for a San Diego franchise included one by local entrepreneurs Harry Cooper and Richard Esquinas (lease-holders of the San Diego Sports Arena), and one by Los Angeles Lakers owner Jerry Buss. Neither bid advanced with any serious traction. Cooper and Esquinas's bid relied on a future new arena that their group would plan to build, but only if they were awarded an expansion team first. Buss's bid meanwhile quickly shifted focus to Anaheim instead. Cooper and Esquinas's bid ultimately gave way to a new proposal by local developer Ron Hahn, who made a similar commitment to build a new arena, but only if an NHL or NBA franchise was secured first. In 1993, the NHL awarded a team to The Walt Disney Company in Anaheim, to be known as the Mighty Ducks of Anaheim (now Anaheim Ducks). In contrast to the efforts in San Diego, Anaheim chose to build a new arena without commitments from any franchise, and were subsequently awarded a team.

At the college level, there are currently ice hockey teams at the club level of each of the major universities and in the area, though NCAA ice hockey has no presence west of Colorado (excluding Alaska) with the Arizona State Sun Devils men's ice hockey, which began play in 2015 and competes as an NCAA Division I independent, the only exception.

San Diego has previously hosted an NCAA Division I ice hockey program, the United States International Gulls men's ice hockey team of United States International University (USIU), which competed for nine years from 1979 until 1988. The USIU Gulls had some success on the ice and were notable for producing two future NHL players and being the only NCAA hockey team west of the Rockies when founded. The team co-founded the short-lived Great West Hockey Conference (GWHC) with Alaska–Anchorage, Alaska–Fairbanks and Northern Arizona in 1985. USIU folded its hockey team and subsequently the entire varsity sports program due to financial strain and ultimate bankruptcy. In 2001, the university underwent a merger with the California School of Professional Psychology and reorganization, to form Alliant International University. Alliant had a small sports program for a few years before intercollegiate were phased out entirely in 2007.

Soccer
San Diego has never hosted a Major League Soccer (MLS) team, though it is currently represented by San Diego Loyal SC of the USL Championship (the highest level of minor league soccer) as well as Albion San Diego SC of the National Independent Soccer Association (one of three leagues occupying the second-highest level of minor league soccer). Despite not hosting an MLS team, San Diego did host the 1999 MLS All-Star Game.

In 2022, the city became the home to the San Diego Wave FC, a new expansion team of the National Women's Soccer League (NWSL), slated to play its home games at Torero Stadium before moving to its permanent home of Snapdragon Stadium upon that venue's completion in September 2022. Wave FC's first home game at Snapdragon Stadium, against regional rival and fellow 2022 NWSL entry Angel City FC, drew a league-record sellout crowd of 32,000.

The city also hosts the San Diego Sockers of the Major Arena Soccer League (MASL), the highest level of professional indoor soccer. The current version of the Sockers follows a lineage of other professional soccer teams which have used the San Diego Sockers name.

The original North American Soccer League (NASL) included a San Diego franchise known as the original San Diego Sockers. The original Sockers indoor franchise also played in the NASL indoor league, Major Indoor Soccer League, Continental Indoor Soccer League, World Indoor Soccer League and second Major Indoor Soccer League.

At the collegiate level, the city boasts both men's and women's varsity teams at each of the three NCAA Division I schools in the city. The San Diego State Aztecs men's and women's soccer teams play at the on-campus SDSU Sports Deck, the San Diego Toreros men's and women's teams play at Torero Stadium, and the UC San Diego Tritons men's and women's teams play at Triton Soccer Stadium.

With the expansion of the minor professional league National Premier Soccer League, the San Diego Flash saw the addition of the North County Battalion and Albion SC Pros. The San Diego SeaLions play in the Women's Premier Soccer League, and the San Diego Zest play in the USL Premier Development League with the SoCal Surf. San Diego Internacional FC began playing in the UPSL in 2019.

On June 25, 2017, it was announced that San Diego 1904 FC would join the North American Soccer League in 2018. The club's founders include professional soccer players Demba Ba, Eden Hazard, Yohan Cabaye and Moussa Sow. In 2021 the club was purchased and became Albion San Diego SC.

On June 19, 2019, it was announced that Landon Donovan would be bringing a new USL Championship team to San Diego. The club, San Diego Loyal SC, began play during the 2020 USL Championship season.

Golf 
The PGA Tour's annual Farmers Insurance Open (originally the San Diego Open and later the Buick Invitational) golf tournament occurs at Torrey Pines Golf Course, which has hosted the tournament since 1968. The event was founded in 1952 at San Diego Country Club in Chula Vista. The tournament was founded in 1952 and was played at a variety of venues in the San Diego area in its early years, beginning with San Diego Country Club in Chula Vista for its first two years. The tournament was also played in Rancho Santa Fe and El Cajon, as well as locally in Mission Valley and Rancho Bernardo during these years.

The LPGA Tour's JTBC Classic is held annually at the Aviara Golf Club in nearby Carlsbad, which has hosted the event since 2012 after the event's relocation from Los Angeles County.

At the college level, the city is home to the NCAA Division I San Diego State Aztecs men's and women's golf teams, the San Diego Toreros men's golf team, and the UC San Diego Tritons men's and women's teams.

The San Diego region is home to 72 golf courses in total.

Lacrosse
On August 30, 2017, the National Lacrosse League (NLL), the world's top box lacrosse league, awarded an expansion franchise to the city of San Diego and owner Joseph Tsai. On October 24, the NLL and San Diego owners unveiled the San Diego Seals identity. Also revealed were the colors, purple, gold, gray, and black, and the team logo. The team began play in December 2018 at Pechanga Arena and earned the second overall playoff seed in the West Division after a successful 10–8 regular season. Home game attendance during the inaugural season averaged 7,769 fans per contest.

In January 2022, it was announced San Diego would host the 2023 World Lacrosse Championship. The newly constructed Snapdragon Stadium is slated to be the event's primary venue, with Torero Stadium and other fields at both San Diego State University and the University of San Diego to also be used for tournament play.

The city is also currently home to the NCAA Division I San Diego State Aztecs women's lacrosse team.

Rugby Union
Rugby union is played at professional and amateur level in San Diego.

The San Diego Legion of Major League Rugby (MLR), the highest level of rugby union in the United States, is based in the city at Torero Stadium and plans to move to the new Snapdragon Stadium in 2023. The Legion began play in 2018 as one of the league's seven founding franchises.

On the women's side, the San Diego Surfers have competed in the 10-team Women's Premier League (WPL), the highest level of domestic women's rugby union, since 2011. Initially founded in 1975 as an amateur team, the club has won the WPL national title twice, in 2016 and 2018, in addition to four national championships in USA Rugby Club 7s.

An array of clubs, ranging from men's and women's clubs to collegiate and high school clubs, are part of the Southern California Rugby Football Union. The United States national rugby sevens team train at the United States Olympic Training Center in Chula Vista, San Diego. Additionally, the USA Sevens, an event in the annual World Rugby Sevens Series for international teams in rugby sevens, was held in Petco Park from 2007 through 2009 before moving to Las Vegas for 2010 and back to Los Angeles more recently.

The San Diego Breakers, who played in the only season of PRO Rugby (2016) before the league folded, likewise played at Torero Stadium. The USA Sevens, a major international rugby event, was also held at the same stadium from 2007 through 2009. San Diego is also represented by Old Mission Beach Athletic Club RFC, the former home club of USA Rugby's former Captain Todd Clever. San Diego participated in the Western American National Rugby League between 2011 and 2013.

The following is a list of current rugby teams in San Diego;

Professional clubs
 San Diego Legion of Major League Rugby.
 San Diego Surfers of the Women's Premier League

Amateur clubs
 Old Mission Beach Athletic Club RFC (OMBAC) - Pacific Rugby Premiership (PRP)
 San Diego Old Aztecs - D2
 Oceanside Chiefs - D2 & D3 (Oceanside)
 North County Gurkhas - D3 (Escondido)
 San Diego Armada - D4

Collegiate clubs
 San Diego State University Aztec rugby – women's and men's teams
 University of San Diego rugby team – women's and men's teams
 University of California, San Diego Tritons rugby club – women's and men's teams

Tennis 
The San Diego Aviators of World TeamTennis (WTT) moved to San Diego from New York City prior to the start of the 2014 season. They were founded in 1995 and formerly known as the New York Sportimes. The Aviators played their 2014 home matches at the indoor Valley View Casino Center. In 2015, they moved to Omni La Costa Resort and Spa in Carlsbad. In their first three seasons in San Diego, they finished with the league's top regular-season record twice (2014 and 2016), and won the King Trophy as 2016 WTT champions.

San Diego has had two previous WTT franchises. The San Diego Friars were a WTT expansion franchise that began play in 1975. They used the San Diego Sports Arena (now Valley View Casino Center) as their primary home venue but played some home matches at the Anaheim Convention Center between 1975 and 1977, before Anaheim got its own team in 1978. After missing the playoffs their first two seasons, the Friars qualified in 1977 and 1978, and were the 1978 Western Division champions, but lost in the quarterfinals. The team folded after the 1978 season. International Tennis Hall of Famers Rod Laver and Dennis Ralston played for the Friars.

In 1981, the Friars returned as an expansion franchise as WTT resumed operations rebranded as TeamTennis after a hiatus. After three seasons as the Friars, the team was renamed the San Diego Buds before the 1984 season. The Buds won both the 1984 and 1985 TeamTennis championships but folded following the 1985 season. Hall of Famer Rosie Casals was the Friars player-coach in 1983.

At the collegiate level, San Diego State, University of San Diego, and UC San Diego each support both men's and women's NCAA Division I tennis teams.

Ultimate 
Ultimate (also known as ultimate frisbee and ultimate disk) is a newer but quickly-growing sport in San Diego like many other US cities. San Diego is represented at the highest professional level of men's ultimate in the American Ultimate Disc League (AUDL) by the San Diego Growlers, who began play in 2015. A women's highest-level team in the Western Ultimate League (WUL), the San Diego Super Bloom, was launched in 2020 as one of the league's founding franchises and initially known as the San Diego Wolfpack.

Former teams

Major professional former teams

Other professional teams

Former college teams

See also
 San Diego#Sports
 San Diego Hall of Champions
 San Diego sports curse
 Breitbard Hall of Fame
 Sports in California

References

 
History of San Diego